Maria Lindström (born 7 March 1963) is a Swedish former tennis player. She won two doubles WTA titles as well as a further ten doubles ITF tournaments during her career. On 15 February 1988, Lindström reached a singles ranking high of world number 87 and on 23 October 1995 ranked world number 44 in doubles.

Lindström appeared 22 times for the Sweden Fed Cup team and represented her country in women's doubles with Catarina Lindqvist at the 1992 Summer Olympics.

WTA Tour finals

Doubles 4 (2-2)

ITF finals

Singles: (1-1)

Doubles: (13-4)

External links 
 
 
 

1963 births
Living people
Swedish female tennis players
Olympic tennis players of Sweden
Tennis players at the 1992 Summer Olympics
Tennis players from Stockholm